Amelia Sophie Gentleman, (born 1972) is a British journalist. She is a reporter for The Guardian, and won the Paul Foot Award for reporting the Windrush scandal.

Early life and education 
Born in London in 1972, Gentleman is the daughter of the artist David Gentleman and his second wife Susan Evans, daughter of George Ewart Evans.

Gentleman was educated at St Paul's Girls' School, an independent day school, before studying Russian and History at Wadham College, Oxford.

Career 
Earlier in her career, Gentleman was the New Delhi correspondent for the International Herald Tribune and the Paris and Moscow correspondent for The Guardian. Since 2009, she has been in London, writing features for The Guardian, mainly looking at the impact of government policy.

For six months, Gentleman worked for The Guardian on the story of the Windrush scandal, the deportation of people originally from British colonies in the Caribbean, or elsewhere in the Commonwealth, who legally had a right of residence in the UK. According to Sara El-Harrak, writing for the openDemocracy website, the issue had previously been neglected by the British media. The scandal broke in April 2018 and within weeks led to the resignation of the Conservative Home Secretary, Amber Rudd. Gentleman won the 2018 Paul Foot Award for her work on the Windrush story. She was also named as the Political Studies Association's journalist of the year for 2018, with Carole Cadwalladr, and as journalist of the year in the British Journalism Awards, 2018.

Personal life 
Gentleman met Jo Johnson, former MP for Orpington, while at Oxford University in 1991. They married in 2005 and live in Camden. The couple have two children.

Awards 
 2007 Amnesty International Hong Kong Human Rights Press Awards
 2007 Ramnath Goenka Prize for Best Foreign Correspondent
 2010 Press Awards Feature Writer of the Year
 2012 Orwell Prize Winner for Journalism
 2017 Press Awards Specialist Journalist of the Year
 2018 
Paul Foot Award
Political Studies Association Journalist of the Year (joint award with Carole Cadwalladr)
 Journalist of the Year, British Journalism Awards
 2019
 The Cudlipp award for Windrush investigation
 The Amnesty impact award for Windrush investigation
 Print journalist of the year, London press club
 Sue Lloyd Roberts media award, in association with UNHCR and Migrants Organise
 Best campaigning/investigative journalism, Drum online media awards

Books

 The Windrush Betrayal, Exposing the Hostile Environment, Guardian Faber, longlisted for the Baillie Gifford Prize 2019

References

External links 
 Guardian columns by Amelia Gentleman
 

1972 births
Living people
Alumni of Wadham College, Oxford
British anti-poverty advocates
British feminists
British political journalists
The Guardian journalists
Spouses of life peers
English people of Scottish descent
English people of Welsh descent